Martin Francis Callaghan (June 9, 1900 – June 23, 1975) was a Major League Baseball outfielder who played for four seasons. He played for the Chicago Cubs from 1922 to 1923 and the Cincinnati Reds in 1928 and 1930.

A 1916 graduate of Norwood High School, Callaghan was highly celebrated in his hometown of Norwood, Massachusetts. A "Marty Callaghan Day" was once held, which attracted many spectators and the Norwood Brass Band.

In addition to his 4 major league seasons, Callaghan played 11 seasons in the minor leagues, playing until 1934. Callaghan has the distinction of being one of few players in major league history that have batted three times in one inning, a feat that Callaghan accomplished on August 25, 1922. He had two singles and a strikeout during the fourth inning of a 26-23 victory over the Philadelphia Phillies

References

External links

1900 births
1975 deaths
Major League Baseball outfielders
Baseball players from Massachusetts
Chicago Cubs players
Cincinnati Reds players